Geronimo Stilton is an Italian children's chapter book series written by Elisabetta Dami under the pen name of the title character. Scholastic Corporation has published the English version of the series in the US since February 2004, and the books are published by Sweet Cherry Publishing in the UK. The series is set in a fictional version of Earth dominated by anthropomorphic mice and rats and focuses on the title character, a mouse who lives in New Mouse City on Mouse Island. A best-selling author in-universe, Geronimo Stilton works as editor and publisher for the newspaper The Rodent's Gazette. He has a younger sister named Thea Stilton, a cousin named Trap Stilton, and his favourite nephew, nine-year-old Benjamin Stilton. Geronimo is a nervous, mild-mannered mouse who prefers a quiet life, yet keeps getting into faraway adventures with Thea, Trap, and Benjamin to both fictional and real locations. The books are written as fictional memoirs of him going on them and designed and distributed in full color, depicting important words in the text as colored and in illustrative typefaces.

The series, combined with many spin-off series, has sold over 180 million copies worldwide, and with over 200 entries, it is one of the best-selling book series. The books have been translated into 49 languages, with more languages in progress. The series has also been adapted into an animated television series of the same name, theatrical shows, and video games.

Creation
In the 1990s, Elisabetta Dami found herself unable to have children, so she volunteered at children's hospitals to deal with this. Inspired by Patch Adams, who participates in Clown Care, she told humorous and adventurous stories starring the character of Geronimo Stilton and teaching morals to entertain patients. They appeared to love the stories, which would lead to her writing and publishing such stories.

This character was born from my heart to bring me closer to a dream I sadly was not able to fulfil: that of having children. ... I started doing volunteer work with sick children. It was at the time when an American doctor called Patch Adams taught us that children need to laugh in order to recover ... I invented and told funny stories about a clumsy mouse that had lots of adventures, with twists in the plots and guaranteed happy endings. I wanted to entertain children, see their eyes bristling with joy and create a bridge toward enchantment. It was already Geronimo, the shy mouse that ... naturally, as a firm believer in teamwork, ended up calling on the help of his many friends. Thanks to him I became a mum to millions of children and experienced the friendship that helps one achieve everything, as well as honesty and sincerity that instil value in every single gesture, not to mention the curiosity and sense of adventure that keep you going.

Characters

Geronimo Stilton is the protagonist and editor and publisher for The Rodent's Gazette, the most famous newspaper on New Mouse Island. He has a love of knowledge and has a sense of ethics and morals, but in spite of this, he is still a bit lonely. He is somewhat of a coward because he does not like to go on adventures with his family and friends, although he is passionate about writing adventure stories, which sell well in-universe. He was adopted by the Stilton family when he was young.
Thea Stilton is Geronimo's younger sister and special correspondent for The Rodent's Gazette. Contrasted to Geronimo, she loves to have an adventure with Trap, Benjamin, and Geronimo and explore to have material for an article. While she is portrayed as brave, adventurous, and well prepared too, she is often reckless and gets into trouble while searching for reportable material. She has had many boyfriends. For a time, Thea taught a journalism class at Whale Island University to five mice, Pamela, Paulina, Violet, Colette, and Nicky, who would name their group after her as the Thea Sisters and chronicle adventures of their own in the series Thea Stilton. She was also adopted by the Stilton family when she was young with her biological brother, Geronimo Stilton.

Trap Stilton is Geronimo's cousin who travels along with him when he's called on. He is the owner of the store Cheap Junk for Less and is often mentioned as a chef. He is an awful jokester who loves to play tricks on others, especially Geronimo because he is easily frightened, which Trap is ironically also, and considered gullible by Trap. However, he has a big heart and does not trick others to be mean.
 Benjamin Stilton is Geronimo and Thea's young 9-year old nephew, loves Geronimo, who is very fond of him, and often comes along with him on his many adventures.
 William Shortpaws, also known as Cheap Mouse Willy, is the founder of The Rodent's Gazette and Geronimo's grandfather. Despite being retired, he is Geronimo's boss and occasionally checks on his grandson to make sure he is not slacking off. Geronimo is afraid of him because most of the time he gets scolded by him. Like Thea, he likes to go on dangerous adventures. He adopted Geronimo and Thea Stilton when they were young. 
 Sally Ratmousen is a recurring antagonist and publisher of The Daily Rat, The Rodent's Gazettes biggest competitor. She is known to be obnoxious, tough, and disobedient and has carried out many nasty acts aimed at Geronimo out of jealousy. Her grandmother, Molly Ratmousen, founded The Daily Rat at the same time as The Rodent's Gazette founding.
 Creepella von Cacklefur is an enchanting and mysterious mouse who lives in Mysterious Valley and works both as a special effects designer for scary films and haunted houses and as a journalist. She has a pet bat named Bitewing and a huge crush on Geronimo, wanting to be his girlfriend. She is the protagonist of her own spin-off series with the same name.
Professor Paws von Volt is a scientist and Geronimo's friend. He has dedicated his life to discoveries and a habit of moving his secret lab from one location to another so as to keep his work as secretive, to the point Geronimo doesn't know where to find him.
 Petunia Pretty Paws (original name Patty Spring) is a TV reporter and an environmentalist, whom Geronimo has a crush on, but can't express it to her because of shyness. Geronimo's cousin Trap is aware of this situation and loves to tease him for it. She also has a pesky niece, named Bugsy Wugsy.
 Hercule Poirat (a pun on Hercule Poirot) is Geronimo's childhood friend and private investigator of New Mouse City, bringing him on many of his cases. He likes to play tricks, especially on Geronimo and has unpredictable disguises, a passion for bananas, with his vehicles even being banana-shaped, and a crush on Geronimo's sister, Thea. (In the third entry of the graphic novel series, The Coliseum Con, he is identified as Nosymouse Squeak.)
  Wolfgang Wild Paws: is Petunia's twin brother and a TV producer, who is an environmentalist, like his sister.
Bruce Hyena is a parachutist, adventurer, and Geronimo's adventurous friend who likes to sign him up on many crazy adventures. He, like Hercule Poirat, has a crush on Geronimo's sister, Thea. He protects nature and has a great direction sense. He secretly loves romantic novels and poetry.
 Shorty Tao is Bruce Hyena's cousin, the managing editor of The Rodent's Gazette, and a karate world champion. She has a little brother, Baby Tao.
 The Paws family lived on a farm for many generations in the Giant Sequoia Valley, in Dolphin Bay. They are good friends with the Stiltons.
 Bugsy Wugsy (original name Pandora) is the daughter of John Wugsy and Furry Paws and Benjamin's best friend, whom she has a crush on. She wants to be an environmentalist like her aunt Petunia.
Grandfather Paws: Well-versed in natural sciences and once travelled the world in search of rare butterflies.
Grandmother Paws: At a young age, she travelled all over the world when planes were not built yet.
Teddy Paws: Son of Grandfather and Grandmother Paws and brother of Bobby Paws. He runs the farm with his brother.
Jenny Littlepaw: Teddy's wife. She's an exceptional cook.
Tom Paws: Son of Teddy and Jenny. He adores working with his father and inherited a passion for natural sciences from his grandfather.
Lucy Vally: Tom's wife. She has a passion for growing all kinds of plants, flowers, fruits, and vegetables.
Lilly, Lally, and Lolly Paws: Daughters of Lucy and Tom. Lilly is five and adores helping her mother in the garden. Lally is seven, she enjoys horseback riding. Lolly is eleven and dreams of travelling like Grandmother Paws.
Bobby Paws: Son of Grandfather and Grandmother Paws and brother of Teddy Paws. He also worked on the farm.
Suzy Rattella: Bobby's wife. She has a passion for dolphins and works for the Marine Center in New Mouse City.
Furry Paws: Daughter of Bobby and Suzy and sister of Petunia and Wolfgang.
John Wugsy: Furry's husband. He loves living in the country and taking long bike rides.

Books

Not all books and spin-off series are listed. The following lists are of ones that have been or are planned to be released in English unless otherwise noted.

Geronimo Stilton

 Lost Treasure of the Emerald Eye (February 2004, originally published in 1997 in Italy as Il mistero dell'occhio di smeraldo)
 The Curse of the Cheese Pyramid (February 2004, originally published in 2000 in Italy as Il mistero della piramide di formaggio)
 Cat and Mouse in a Haunted House (February 2004, originally published in 2000 in Italy as Il castello di Zampaciccia Zanzamiao)
 I'm Too Fond of My Fur! (February 2004, originally published in 2000 in Italy as Ci tengo alla pelliccia, io!)
 Four Mice Deep in the Jungle (March 2004, originally published in 2000 in Italy as Quattro topi nella giungla nera)
 Paws Off, Cheddarface! (April 2004, originally published in 2000 in Italy as Giù le zampe, faccia di fontina!)
 Red Pizzas for a Blue Count (May 2004, originally published in 1997 in Italy as Una granita di mosche per il Conte)
 Attack of the Bandit Cats (June 2004, originally published in 1997 in Italy as Il galeone dei Gatti Pirati)
 A Fabumouse Vacation for Geronimo (July 2004, originally published in 2002 in Italy as Quella stratopica vacanza alla pensione Mirasorci...)
 All Because of a Cup of Coffee (August 2004, originally published in 1999 in Italy as Tutta colpa di un caffè con panna)
 It's Halloween, You 'Fraidy Mouse! (September 2004, originally published in 2001 in Italy as Halloween...che fifa felina!)
 Merry Christmas, Geronimo! (October 2004, originally published in 2000 in Italy as È natale, Stilton!)
 The Phantom of the Subway (November 2004, originally published in 2000 in Italy as Il Fantasma del Metrò)
 The Temple of the Ruby of Fire (December 2004, originally published in 2003 in Italy as Il tempio del rubino di fuoco)
 The Mona Mousa Code (January 2005, originally published in 1997 in Italy as Il sorriso di Monna Topisa)
 A Cheese-Colored Camper (February 2005, originally published in 2000 in Italy as Un camper color formaggio)
 Watch Your Whiskers, Stilton! (March 2005, originally published in 2001 in Italy as Attenti ai baffi...arriva Topogoni!)
 Shipwreck on the Pirate Islands (April 2005, originally published in 2003 in Italy as L'isola del tesoro fantasma)
 My Name Is Stilton, Geronimo Stilton (May 2005, originally published in 1999 in Italy as Il mio nome è Stilton, Geronimo Stilton)
 Surf's Up, Geronimo! (June 2005, originally published in 2000 in Italy as L'hai voluta la vacanza, Stilton?)
 The Wild, Wild West (July 2005, originally published in 2005 in Italy as Quattro topi nel Far West!)
 The Secret of Cacklefur Castle (August 2005, originally published in 2002 in Italy as Il segreto della Famiglia Tenebrax)
 Valentine's Day Disaster (January 2006, originally published in 2005 in Italy as La vita e un rodeo!)
 Field Trip to Niagara Falls (March 2006, originally published in 2005 in Italy as In campeggio alle cascate del Niagara)
 The Search for Sunken Treasure (June 2006, originally published in 2000 in Italy as Il misterioso del tesero scomparso)
 The Mummy with No Name (August 2006, originally published in 2005 in Italy as La mummia senza nome)
 The Christmas Toy Factory (October 2006, originally published in 2006 in Italy as Il mistero degli elfi)
 Wedding Crasher (January 2007, originally published in 1999 in Italy as Benvenuti a Rocca Taccagna)
 Down and Out Down Under (March 2007, originally published in 2006 in Italy as È arrivata Patty Spring!)
 The Mouse Island Marathon (June 2007, originally published in 2004 in Italy as La maratona piu pazza del mondo!)
 The Mysterious Cheese Thief (August 2007, originally published in 2005 in Italy as Il misterioso ladro di formaggi)
 Valley of the Giant Skeletons (January 2008, originally published in 2006 in Italy as La valle degli scheletri giganti)
 Geronimo and the Gold Medal Mystery (April 2008, originally published in 2004 in Italy as Lo strano caso dei Giochi Olimpici)
 Geronimo Stilton, Secret Agent (July 2008, originally published in 2007 in Italy as Agente segreto Zero Zero Kappa)
 A Very Merry Christmas (October 2008, originally published in 2007 in Italy as Inseguimento a New York!)
 Geronimo's Valentine (January 2009, originally published in 2007 in Italy as Lo strano caso del tiramisu)
 The Race Across America (April 2009, originally published in 2006 in Italy as La Corsa Piu Pazza d'America)
 A Fabumouse School Adventure (July 2009, originally published in 2008 in Italy as Ore 8: a scuola di formaggio!)
 Singing Sensation (October 2009, originally published in 2004 in Italy as Lo strano caso del sorcio stonato)
 The Karate Mouse (January 2010, originally published in 2005 in Italy as Te le do io il karate)
 Mighty Mount Kilimanjaro (April 2010, originally published in 2004 in Italy as Che fifa sul Kilimangiaro!)
 The Peculiar Pumpkin Thief (July 2010, originally published in 2003 in Italy as Lo strano caso della Torre Pagliaccia)
 I'm Not a Supermouse! (October 2010, originally published in 2008 in Italy as )
 The Giant Diamond Robbery (January 2011, originally published in 2008 in Italy as Il Furto del Diamante Gigante)
 Save the White Whale! (April 2011, originally published in 2007 in Italy as Salviamo la Balena Bianca!)
 The Haunted Castle (July 2011, originally published in 2007 in Italy as Ritorno a Rocca Taccagna)
 Run for the Hills, Geronimo! (October 2011, originally published in 2009 in Italy as Il tesoro delle Colline Nere)
 The Mystery in Venice (January 2012, originally published in 2009 in Italy as Il mistero della gondola di cristallo)
 The Way of the Samurai (April 2012, originally published in 2010 in Italy as Il segreto dei tre samurai)
 This Hotel Is Haunted! (July 2012, originally published in 2005 in Italy as Lo strano caso del Fantasma al Grand Hotel)
 The Enormouse Pearl Heist (October 2012, originally published in 2009 in Italy as Il mistero della perla gigante)
 Mouse in Space! (February 2013, originally published in 2011 in Italy as S.O.S. C'e un topo nello spazio!)
 Rumble in the Jungle (April 2013, originally published in 2011 in Italy as Grosso guiao in Mato Grosso)
 Get Into Gear, Stilton! (July 2013, originally published in 2011 in Italy as Ingrana la marcia, Stilton!)
 The Golden Statue Plot (October 2013, originally published in 2009 in Italy as Atacco alla statua d'oro!)
 Flight of the Red Bandit (January 2014, originally published in 2012 in Italy as Dov'e sparito Falco Rosso?)
 The Stinky Cheese Vacation (July 2014, originally published in 2012 in Italy as Ma che vacanza... a Rocca Taccagna!)
 The Super Chef Contest (October 2014, originally published in 2012 in Italy as La gara dei Supercuochi)
 Welcome to Moldy Manor (January 2015, originally published in 2013 in Italy as Una tremenda vacanza a Villa Pitocca!)
 The Treasure of Easter Island (July 2015, originally published in 2013 in Italy as Il tesoro di Rapa Nui)
 Mouse House Hunter (October 2015, originally published in 2012 in Italy as Geronimo cerca casa)
 Mouse Overboard! (January 2016, originally published in 2014 in Italy as Allarme...topo in mare!)
 The Cheese Experiment (July 2016, originally published in 2013 in Italy as Lo strano caso dei brufoli blu)
 Magical Mission (October 2016, originally published in 2011 in Italy as Appuntamento...col mistero!)
 Bollywood Burglary (January 2017, originally published in 2015 in Italy as Il mistero del rubino d'Oriente)
 Operation: Secret Recipe (July 2017, originally published in 2015 in Italy as Operazione panettone)
 The Chocolate Chase (October 2017, originally published in 2016 in Italy as Lo strano caso del ladro di cioccolato)
 Cyber-Thief Showdown (January 2018, originally published in 2010 in Italy as C'è un pirata in Internet)
 Hug a Tree, Geronimo (July 2018, originally published in 2015 in Italy as La leggenda della grande quercia)
 The Phantom Bandit (October 2018, originally published in 2016 in Italy as La notte delle zucche mannare)
 Geronimo on Ice! (January 2019, originally published in 2016 in Italy as Il segreto dei pattini d'argento)
 The Hawaiian Heist (May 2019, originally published in 2017 in Italy as Ahi, ahi, ahi, che avventura alle Hawaii!)
 The Missing Movie (October 2019, originally published in 2018 in Italy as Il mistero del film rubato)
 Happy Birthday, Geronimo! (26 December 2019, originally published in 2017 in Italy as Compleanno...con mistero!)
 The Sticky Situation (March 2020, originally published in 2017 in Italy as Te le do io il miele, Stilton!)
 Superstore Surprise (6 October 2020, originally published in 2019 in Italy as Grande Mistero al Megastore!)
 The Last Resort Oasis (2 March 2021, originally published in 2018 in Italy as Vacanze da sogno all'Oasi Sputacchiosa)
 The Mysterious Eye of the Dragon (20 July 2021, originally published in 2018 in Italy as Il misterioso occhio del drago)
 Garbage Dump Disaster (21 September 2021, originally published in 2019 in Italy as Lo strano caso del ladro di spazzatura)
 Have a Heart, Geronimo (4 January 2022, originally published in 2019 in Italy as Un amore da brivido)
 The Super Cup Faceoff (28 June 2022, originally published in 2016 in Italy as Finale di Supercoppa... a Topazia!)
 Mouse VS Wild  (27 December 2022, originally published in 2020 in Italy as Il segreto di Porto Tanfoso)

Geronimo Stilton: Special Edition
A Christmas Tale (October 2005, originally published in 2002 in Italy as Una tenera, tenera, tenera storia sotto la neve)
Christmas Catastrophe (October 2007, originally published in 2005 in Italy as Ahi, ahi, ahi, sono ne guai!)
The Hunt for the Golden Book (April 2014, originally published in 2010 in Italy as Caccia al libro d'oro)
 The Hunt for the Curious Cheese (April 2015, originally published in 2014 in Italy as Lo strano caso dei formaggi strapuzzoni)
 The Hunt for the Secret Papyrus (April 2016, originally published in 2014 in Italy as Il mistero del papiro nero)
The Hunt for the Hundredth Key (April 2017, originally published in 2014 in Italy as Il Castello delle 100 Storie)
 The Hunt for the Colosseum Ghost (March 2018, originally published in 2016 in Italy as Il fantasma del colosseo)

Geronimo Stilton: Mini Mystery
 The Super Scam (2012, originally published in 2007 in Italy as una truffa coi baffi)
 The Lake Monster (2012, originally published in 2007 in Italy as il mosto di lago lago)
 The Mouse Hoax (2012, originally published in 2007 in Italy as IL topo faLsarIo)
 The Cat Gang (2014, originally published in 2008 in Italy as La Banda del Gatto)
 The Double Cross (2014, originally published in 2008 in Italy as La doppia ladra)
 The Cheese Burglar (2014, originally published in 2008 in Italy as Il ladro di croste)

Anniversary Edition
 The Little Book of Happiness (2003)
 The Secret World of Geronimo Stilton (2004)

The Kingdom of Fantasy
The series chronicles Geronimo's adventures in a magical world known as the Kingdom of Fantasy.
The Kingdom of Fantasy (2003, 2007 (English Edition))
The Quest for Paradise: The Return to the Kingdom of Fantasy (2005, 2009 (English Edition))
The Amazing Voyage: The Third Adventure in the Kingdom of Fantasy (2007, 2011 (English Edition))
The Dragon Prophecy: The Fourth Adventure in the Kingdom of Fantasy (2008, 2012 (English Edition))
The Volcano of Fire: The Fifth Adventure in the Kingdom of Fantasy (2009, 2013 (English Edition))
The Search for Treasure: The Sixth Adventure in the Kingdom of Fantasy (2010, 2014 (English Edition))
The Enchanted Charms: The Seventh Adventure in the Kingdom of Fantasy (2011, 2015 (English Edition))
The Hour of Magic: The Eighth Adventure in the Kingdom of Fantasy (2012, 2016 (English Edition))
The Wizard's Wand: The Ninth Adventure in the Kingdom of Fantasy (2014, 2016 (English Edition))
The Ship of Secrets: The Tenth Adventure in the Kingdom of Fantasy (2016, 2017 (English Edition))
The Guardian of the Realm: The Eleventh Adventure in the Kingdom of Fantasy (2017, 2018 (English Edition))
The Island of Dragons: The Twelfth Adventure in the Kingdom of Fantasy (2018, 2019 (English Edition))
The Battle for Crystal Castle: The Thirteenth Adventure in the Kingdom of Fantasy (2019, 2020 (English Edition))
The Keepers of the Empire: The Fourteenth Adventure in the Kingdom of Fantasy (2020, 2021 (English Edition))
The Golden Key: The Fifteenth Adventure in the Kingdom of Fantasy (2021, 2022 (English Edition))
The Kingdom's Treasure: The Sixteenth Adventure in the Kingdom of Fantasy (2022, 2023 (English Edition))

The Kingdom of Fantasy: Special Edition
The Phoenix of Destiny: An Epic Kingdom of Fantasy Adventure (September 2015, originally published in 2013 in Italy as Grande ritorno nel regno della fantasia)
 The Dragon of Fortune: An Epic Kingdom of Fantasy Adventure (September 2017, originally published in 2015 in Italy as Grande ritorno nel regno della fantasia 2)

Thea Stilton
The series is aimed toward female audiences and focuses on the Thea Sisters, a group of five friends who are from different continents and were the students of Thea Stilton.
 Thea Stilton and the Dragon's Code (April 2009, originally published in 2005 in Italy as Il Codice del Drago)
 Thea Stilton and the Mountain of Fire (September 2009, originally published in 2006 in Italy as la Montagna Parlante)
 Thea Stilton and the Ghost of the Shipwreck (March 2010, originally published in 2007 in Italy as Il Vascello Fantasma)
 Thea Stilton and the Secret City (June 2010, originally published in 2006 in Italy as La Città Segreta)
 Thea Stilton and the Mystery in Paris (November 2010, originally published in 2007 in Italy as Mistero a Parigi)
 Thea Stilton and the Cherry Blossom Adventure (March 2011, originally published in 2009 in Italy as Il mistero della bambola nera)
 Thea Stilton and the Star Castaways (June 2011, originally published in 2008 in Italy as NeraI Naufraghi Delle Stelle)
 Thea Stilton: Big Trouble in the Big Apple (September 2011, originally published in 2007 in Italy as Grosso Guaio a New York)
 Thea Stilton and the Ice Treasure (December 2011, originally published in 2008 in Italy as Il tesoro di ghiaccio)
 Thea Stilton and the Secret of the Old Castle (March 2012, originally published in 2009 in Italy as il segreto del castello scozzese)
 Thea Stilton and the Blue Scarab Hunt (June 2012, originally published in 2009 in Italy as Caccia allo scarabeo blu)
 Thea Stilton and the Prince's Emerald (September 2012, originally published in 2010 in Italy as lo smeraldo del principe indiano)
 Thea Stilton and the Mystery on the Orient Express (December 2012, originally published in 2010 in Italy as Mistero sull'Orient Express)
 Thea Stilton and the Dancing Shadows (March 2013, originally published in 2011 in Italy as Mistero dietro le quinte)
 Thea Stilton and the Legend of the Fire Flowers (June 2013, originally published in 2011 in Italy as La leggenda dei fiori di fuoco)
 Thea Stilton and the Spanish Dance Mission (September 2013, originally published in 2012 in Italy as Mission Flamenco)
 Thea Stilton and the Journey to the Lion's Den (December 2013, originally published in 2012 in Italy as Cinque amiche per un leone)
 Thea Stilton and the Great Tulip Heist (March 2014, originally published in 2013 in Italy as Sulle tracce del tulipano nero)
 Thea Stilton and the Chocolate Sabotage (June 2014, originally published in 2013 in Italy as Una cascata di cioccolato!)
 Thea Stilton and the Missing Myth (December 2014, originally published in 2014 in Italy as I segreti dell'Olimpo)
 Thea Stilton and the Lost Letters (June 2015, originally published in 2014 in Italy as Amore alla corte degli zar)
 Thea Stilton and the Tropical Treasure (December 2015, originally published in 2015 in Italy as Avventura ai Caraibi)
 Thea Stilton and the Hollywood Hoax (June 2016, originally published in 2015 in Italy as Colpo di scena a Hollywood)
 Thea Stilton and the Madagascar Madness (December 2016, originally published in 2015 in Italy as Mistero in Madagascar)
 Thea Stilton and the Frozen Fiasco (June 2017, originally published in 2015 in Italy as Inseguimento Tra I Ghiacci)
 Thea Stilton and the Venice Masquerade (December 2017, originally published in 2015 in Italy as Carnevale a Venezia)
 Thea Stilton and the Niagara Splash (May 2018, originally published in 2016 in Italy as Missione Niagara)
 Thea Stilton and the Riddle of the Ruins (December 2018, originally published in 2016 in Italy as Il tesoro scomparso)
 Thea Stilton and the Phantom of the Orchestra (June 2019, originally published in 2016 in Italy as Due cuori a Londra)
 Thea Stilton and the Black Forest Burglary (December 2019, originally published in 2017 in Italy as Il segreto della Foresta Nera)
 Thea Stilton and the Race for the Gold (June 2020, originally published in 2016 in Italy as Sognando le Olimpiadi)
 Thea Stilton and the Rainforest Rescue (1 December 2020, originally published in 2018 in Italy as Destinazione Malesia)
 Thea Stilton and the American Dream (18 May 2021, originally published in 2019 in Italy as Avventura negli U.S.A)
 Thea Stilton and the Roman Holiday (21 September 2021, originally published in 2017 in Italy as Caccia al tesoro a Roma)
 Thea Stilton and the Fiesta in Mexico (7 June 2022, originally published in 2017 in Italy as Viaggio in Messico)
 Thea Stilton and the Cave of Stars  (6 June 2023, originally published in 2019 in Italy as La Grotta Delle Stelle)

Thea Stilton: Special Edition
 The Journey to Atlantis (October 2012, originally published in 2010 in Italy as Il principe di Atlantide)
 The Secret of the Fairies (October 2013, originally published in 2012 in Italy as Il Fate del Lago)
 The Secret of the Snow (October 2014, originally published in 2013 in Italy as Il Fate del Nevi)
 The Cloud Castle (October 2015, originally published in 2014 in Italy as Il Fate del Nuvole)
 The Treasure of the Sea (October 2016, originally published in 2015 in Italy as Il Fate degli Oceni)
 The Land of Flowers (October 2017, originally published in 2016 in Italy as Il Fate dei Fiori)
 The Secret of the Crystal Fairies (October 2018, originally published in 2017 in Italy as Il Fate dei Cristalli)
 The Dance of the Star Fairies (October 2019, originally published in 2018 in Italy as Il Fate delle Stelle)
 The Magic of the Mirror (6 October 2020, originally published in 2019 in Italy as Lo Specchio Segreto delle Fate)

Thea Stilton Mouseford Academy
 Drama at Mouseford (October 2014/April 2018, originally published in 2009 in Italy as "L'amore va in scena a Topford")
 The Missing Diary (October 2014/April 2018, originally published in 2009 in Italy as "Il diario segreto di Colette")
 Mouselets in Danger (November 2014/April 2018, originally published in 2009 in Italy as "Tea sisters in pericolo!")
 Dance Challenge (November 2014/April 2018, originally published in 2010 in Italy as "Sfida a ritmo di danza")
 The Secret Invention (February 2015/August 2018, originally published in 2009 in Italy as "Il progetto super segreto")
 A Mouseford Musical (February 2015/December 2018, originally published in 2010 in Italy as "Cinque amiche per un musical")
 Mice Take the Stage (December 2015, originally published in 2010 in Italy as "La strada del successo")
 A Fashionable Mystery (December 2015, originally published in 2010 in Italy as "Chi si nasconde a Topford")
 The Mysterious Love Letter (May 2016, originally published in 2010 in Italy as "Una misteriosa lettera d'amore")
 A Dream on Ice (May 2016, originally published in 2011 in Italy as "Un sogno sul ghiaccio per Colette")
 Lights, Camera, Action! (September 2016, originally published in 2011 in Italy as "Ciak si gira a Topford")
 Mice on the Runway (2016, originally published in 2011 in Italy as "Top model per un giorno)
 Sea Turtle Rescue (December 2017, originally published in 2011 in Italy as "Missione mare pulito")
 The Secret Notebook (2018, originally published in 2011 in Italy as "Il club delle poetesse")
 The Friendship Recipe (2018, originally published in 2012 in Italy as "La ricetta dell’amicizia")
 The Royal Ball (2018, originally published in 2012 in Italy as "Gran ballo con il principe")
 The Puppy Problem (2018, originally published in 2015 in Italy as "Un cucciolo in cerca di casa")
 The Secret of the Butterflies (2019, originally published in 2015 in Italy as "Il segreto delle farfalle dorate")
 The Missing Mirror (2019, originally published in 2016 in Italy as "Lo specchio della sirena")
 The Sweetest Dream(2019, originally published in 2015 in Italy as "I dolci del cuore")

Thea Stilton and the Treasure Seekers
 The Treasure Seekers (2019, originally published in 2016 in Italy as "Alla Ricerca Dei Tesori Perduti")
 The Compass of the Stars (2020, originally published in 2017 in Italy as "Tesori Perduti: La Bussola Di Stelle")
 The Legend of the Maze (2021, originally published in 2018 in Italy as "Tesori Perduti: Il Labirinto Incantato")

Creepella von Cacklefur
This series follows Creepella von Cacklefur, one of the recurring characters of the main series.
 The Thirteen Ghosts (August 2011, originally published in 2010 in Italy as Tredici fantasmi per Tenebrosa)
 Meet Me in Horrorwood (August 2011, originally published in 2010 in Italy as Mistero a Castelteschio)
 Ghost Pirate Treasure (February 2012, originally published in 2010 in Italy as Il tesoro del pirata fantasma)
 Return of the Vampire (August 2012, originally published in 2011 in Italy as Un vampiro da salvare!)
 Fright Night (August 2013, originally published in 2011 in Italy as Il rap della paura)
 Ride for Your Life! (August 2014, originally published in 2011 in Italy as Brividi sull'ottovolante)
 A Suitcase Full of Ghosts (August 2015, originally published in 2011 in Italy as Una valigia piena di fantasmi)
 The Phantom of the Theater (August 2016, originally published in 2012 in Italy as Il fantasma del Teatro dei Sospiri)
 The Haunted Dinosaur (August 2017, originally published in 2012 in Italy as Il risveglio del Brividosauro)

Cavemice
The series focuses on Geronimo's ancestor, Geronimo Stiltonoot, in the Stone Age where dinosaurs co-exist with mice and prehistoric mammals.
 The Stone of Fire (January 2013, originally published in 2011 in Italy as Via le zampe dalla pietra di fuoco!)
 Watch Your Tail! (May 2013, originally published in 2011 in Italy as Attenti alla coda, meteoriti in arrivo)
 Help, I'm in Hot Lava! (November 2013, originally published in 2012 in Italy as Sei nella lava fino al collo, Stiltonùt!)
 The Fast and the Frozen (February 2014, originally published in 2011 in Italy as Per mille mammut, mi si gela la coda!)
 The Great Mouse Race (June 2014, originally published in 2012 in Italy as Per mille ossicini, vai col brontosauro!)
 Don't Wake the Dinosaur! (November 2014, originally published in 2012 in Italy as Dinosauro che dorme non piglia topi!)
 I'm a Scaredy-Mouse! (March 2015, originally published in 2012 in Italy as La tremenda carica dei Tremendosauri)
 Surfing for Secrets (July 2015, originally published in 2013 in Italy as Mordosauri in mare... tesoro da salvare!)
 Get the Scoop, Geronimo! (November 2015, originally published in 2013 in Italy as Cadono notizie da urlo, Stiltont!)
 My Autosaurus Will Win! (March 2016, originally published in 2012 in Italy as Mi si è bucato il trottosauro!
 Sea Monster Surprise (July 2016, originally published in 2013 in Italy as Polposaura affamata... coda stritolata)
 Paws Off the Pearl! (November 2016, originally published in 2013 in Italy as Trottosauro contro ostrica mannara)
 The Smelly Search (March 2017, originally published in 2014 in Italy as Per mille pietruzze... il gonfiosauro fa le puzze!)
 Shoo, Caveflies! (July 2017, originally published in 2014 in Italy as Non svegliate le mosche Ronf Ronf)
 A Mammoth Mystery (November 2017, originally published in 2013 in Italy as Ahi ahi Stiltonut, ?finito il latte di mammut!)

Spacemice
The series is set in a parallel universe based on space opera, featuring Geronimo Stiltonix as the captain of the entire spaceship MouseStar1.
 Alien Escape (2014, originally published in 2013 in Italy as Minaccia dal pianeta Blurgo)
 You're Mine, Captain! (2014, originally published in 2013 in Italy as Un'aliena per il capitano Stiltonix)
 Ice Planet Adventure (February 2015, originally published in 2013 in Italy as L'invasione dei dispettosi Ponf Ponf)
 The Galactic Goal (2015, originally published in 2014 in Italy as Sfida galattica all'ultimo gol)
 Rescue Rebellion (2015, originally published in 2014 in Italy as Il pianeta dei cosmosauri ribelli)
 The Underwater Planet (2016, originally published in 2014 in Italy as Il mistero del pianeta sommerso)
 Beware! Space Junk!(2016, originally published in 2015 in Italy as pericolo spazzatura spaziale)
 Away in a Star Sled (2016, originally published in 2014 in Italy as la magica notte delle stelle danzanti)
 Slurp Monster Showdown (2017, originally published in 2015 in Italy as Stiltonix contro il mostro Slurp)
 Pirate Spacecat Attack (2017, originally published in 2015 in Italy as Sfida stellare all'ultimo baffo)
 We'll Bite Your Tail, Geronimo! (2017, originally published in 2015 in Italy as E poi ti mordicchio la coda, Stiltonix!)
 The Invisible Planet (2018, originally published in 2016 in Italy as Il pianeta invisibile)

Heromice
The series focuses on Geronimo Superstilton and the Heromice, a team of superheroes who live in Muskrat City and watch over the crimes prevailing in the city.
Mice to the Rescue (July 2014, originally published in 2012 in Italy as "Fermi tutti, superscamorze in arrivo! ")
Robot Attack (November 2014, originally published in 2013 in Italy as "La carica dei robottini puzzoni")
Flood Mission (March 2015, originally published in 2013 in Italy as "Missione speciale... diluvio universale!")
The Perilous Plants (July 2015, originally published in 2013 in Italy as "Il superattacco delle margherite zannute")
The Invisible Thief (November 2015, originally published in 2014 in Italy as "Due supertopi contro il ladro invisibile")
Dinosaur Danger (November 2016, originally published in 2014 in Italy as "Polpette di supertopo per il T-Rex")
Time Machine Trouble (March 2017, originally published in 2014 in Italy as "SuperGer e la supermacchina del tempo")
Charge of the Clones (May 2017, originally published in 2015 in Italy as "Superallarme, Supertopo in fuga!")
Insect Invasion (July 2017, originally published in 2015 in Italy as "S.O.S. Superinsetti all'assalto")
Sweet Dreams, Sewer Rats! (December 2017, originally published in 2015 in Italy as "La lunga notte dei Supertopi ")
Revenge of the Mini-Mice! (February 2018, originally published in 2016 in Italy as "Mini-Topi contro Maxi-Pantegane")

Micekings
The series is set in the Viking Age and stars Geronimo Stiltonord, who lives in the village of Mouseborg and faces fiery, mouse-eating dragons every day.

 Attack of the Dragons (April 2016, originally published in 2014 in Italy as Sei ciccia per draghi)
 The Famouse Fjord Race (August 2016, originally published in 2014 in Italy as Scattare scattareee... Geronimord!)
 Pull the Dragon's Tooth! (December 2016, originally published in 2014 in Italy as Toglilo tu, il dente al dragante!)
 Stay Strong, Geronimo! (April 2017, originally published in 2015 in Italy as La rivincita delle topinghe!)
 The Mysterious Message (August 2017, originally published in 2015 in Italy as Nella terra degli uffa uffa)
 The Helmet Holdup (December 2017, originally published in 2015 in Italy as Chi ha rubato l'elmo Topingo?)
 The Dragon Crown (April 2018, originally published in 2016 in Italy as la corona dei draganti)
 The Great Miceking Stone (November 2018, originally published in 2017 in Italy as Il mistero della pietra topinga)

The Journey Through Time
 The Journey Through Time (2004, February 2014 (English Edition))
 Back in Time: The Second Journey Through Time (2006, February 2015 (English Edition))
 The Race Against Time: The Third Journey Through Time (2010, February 2016 (English Edition))
 Lost in Time: The Fourth Journey Through Time (2011, February 2017 (English Edition))
 No Time to Lose: The Fifth Journey Through Time (2012, February 2018 (English Edition))
 The Test of Time: The Sixth Journey Through Time (2013, February 2019 (English Edition))
 Time Warp: The Seventh Journey Through Time (2014, February 2020 (English Edition))
 Out of Time: The Eighth Journey Through Time (2016, 5 January 2021 (English Edition))

Classic Tales
The series are adaptations of public domain literature with anthropomorphic mouse characters.
 Treasure Island (2006, 1 November 2014 (English Edition))
 Little Women (2007, 1 October 2015 (English Edition))
 Around the World in Eighty Days (2006, 1 October 2016 (English Edition))
 The Wonderful Wizard of Oz (2011, 1 July 2017 (English Edition))
 Alice in Wonderland (2010, 1 December 2017 (English Edition))
 Moby Dick (2014, 1 June 2018 (English Edition))
 The Secret Garden (2012, 1 November 2018 (English Edition))
 Gulliver's Travels  (2012, 1 August 2019 (English Edition))
 A Christmas Carol (2013, 1 November 2019 (English Edition))
 Journey to the Center of the Earth (2016, 1 November 2019 (English Edition))
 20,000 Leagues Under The Sea (2009, February 2020 (English Edition))

Thea Stilton Classic Tales
 Romeo and Juliet (2019, October 2020 (English Edition))
 Pride and Prejudice (2019, October 2020 (English Edition))
 A Midsummer Night's Dream (2020, November 2022 (English Edition))

Graphic novels
The English translations of the graphic novels are published by Papercutz.

 The Discovery of America (18 August 2009, originally published in 2007 in Italy as "Alla scoperta dell'america")
 The Secret of the Sphinx (18 August 2009, originally published in 2007 in Italy as "Il Segreto Della Sfinge")
 The Coliseum Con (24 November 2009, originally published in 2007 in Italy as "La Truffa Del Colosseo ")
 Following the Trail of Marco Polo (13 April 2010, originally published in 2007 in Italy as "Sulle Tracce di Marco Polo")
 The Great Ice Age (6 July 2010, originally published in 2008 in Italy as "La Grande Era Glaciale")
 Who Stole the Mona Lisa?  (26 October 2010, originally published in 2009 in Italy as "Chi Ha Rubato Ia Gioconda")
 Dinosaurs in Action  (1 February 2011, originally published in 2009 in Italy as "Dinosauri in Azione")
 Play It Again, Mozart!  (11 October 2011, originally published in 2011 in Italy as "Suonala Ancora, Mozart!")
 The Weird Book Machine  (24 January 2012, originally published in 2011 in Italy as "La Strana Macchina dei Libri ")
 Geronimo Stilton Saves the Olympics  (17 July 2012, originally published in 2012 in Italy as "Hai Salvato Le Olimpiadi, Stilton")
 We'll Always Have Paris  (23 October 2012, originally published in 2012 in Italy as "Il Mistero Della Torre Eiffel")
 The First Samurai  (19 March 2013, originally published in 2011 in Italy as "Il Primo Samurai")
 The Fastest Train in the West (October 2013, originally published in 2012 in Italy as "Il Treno Piu Veloce Del Far West")
 The First Mouse on the Moon (24 June 2014, originally published in 2013 in Italy as "Il Primo Topo Sulla Luna")
 All for Stilton, Stilton for All! (13 January 2015, originally published in 2014 in Italy as "Uno per Tutti, Tutti per Stilton")
 Lights, Camera, Stilton! (4 August 2015, originally published in 2014 in Italy as "Ciak, Si Gira, Geronimo Stilton")
 The Mystery of the Pirate Ship (24 May 2016)
 First to the Last Place on Earth! (22 November 2016)
 Lost in Translation (29 August 2017)
 Saving Liberty (October 2018)

Thea Stilton graphic novels
 The Secret of Whale Island (30 April 2013, originally published in 2008 in Italy as "Il Segreto Dell'isola Delle Balene")
 Revenge of the Lizard Club (20 August 2013, originally published in 2008 in Italy as "La Rivicinta del Club Delle Lucertole")
 The Treasure of the Viking Ship (22 April 2014, originally published in 2009 in Italy as "Il tesoro Della Nave Vichinga")
 Catching the Giant Wave (30 September 2014, originally published in 2009 in Italy as "Aspettando L'Onda Gigante ")
 The Secret of the Waterfall In The Woods (9 February 2016)
 The Thea Sisters and the Mystery At Sea (30 August 2016)
 A Song for the Thea Sisters (14 March 2017)
 The Thea Sisters and the Secret Treasure Hunt (26 December 2017)

Geronimo Stilton Reporter
Taking the place of the original graphic novels, the Geronimo Stilton Reporter series are adaptations of episodes from the Geronimo Stilton animated series, which ended the year before the first entry was published.
 Operation Shufongfong (16 October 2018)
 It's My Scoop! (4 June 2019)
 Stop Acting Around! (8 October 2019)
 The Mummy with No Name (28 January 2020)
 Barry the Moustache (9 June 2020)
 Paws Off, Cheddarface! (27 October 2020)
 Going Down to Chinatown (2 March 2021)
 Hypno Tick-Tock (6 July 2021)
 Mask of the Rat-Jitsu (16 November 2021)
 Blackrat’s Treasure (22 March 2022)
 Mystery on the Rodent Express  (26 July 2022)
  Mouse House of the Future (not yet published)
  Reported Missing (not yet published)

Geronimo Stilton the Graphic Novel
The graphic novels are illustrated by Tom Angleberger.
 The Sewer Rat Stink (May 2020, based on the 2003 Geronimo Stilton book Lo strano caso della Pantegana Puzzona)
 Slime for Dinner (2 February 2021, based on the 2018 Geronimo Stilton book Cena con mistero)
 Great Rat Rally (4 January 2022, based on the 2019 Geronimo Stilton book Metti il turbo, Stilton!)
Last Ride at Luna Park (17 May 2022, based on the 2020 Geronimo Stilton book Brividi Felini Al Luna Park)

Reception
Publishers Weekly review of Lost Treasure of the Emerald Eye praised the book for its fast pace, chapter format, full-color design, and usage of colored typefaces. Kirkus Reviews review of the Special Edition book The Hunt for the Hundredth Key states that "the simplistic mysteries and silly jokes are in line with other series outings, 'special edition' status notwithstanding." Its review of Geronimo on Ice! found it to be average, criticizing the plot holes, and remarks that it "skates by without landing any impressive tricks."

Kirkus Reviews reviews of Cavemice entry The Stone of Fire and Spacemice entry Alien Escape were positive, albeit criticized the slow pacing at the beginning of the former. Its review of Creepella Von Cacklefur entry Fright Night felt the plot wasn't "the strongest of Stilton spinoffs". Its review of The Kingdom of Fantasy entry The Enchanted Charms was mixed, criticizing the plot for not being original and appealing enough, but praising the art and incorporation of puzzles.

Martha Conover of The Washington Post noted Geronimo Stilton as a children's series with potentially negative racial stereotypes.

Other media
There are also audiobooks of the Geronimo Stilton books published by Scholastic Audio Books, available on CD and as downloadables through various services such as OverDrive and Audible. There are three stories in the first three collections (1–3, 4–6, 7–9), book 10 is sold by itself, and the remaining books are sold in pairs (11–12, 13–14, 15–16, 17–18, 20–21, 22 and 24, 25–26). Books 1 through 10 are read by Edward Herrmann. Books 11–18, 20–22 and 24, and 25–26 are read by Bill Lobley.

Film
In February 2023, Radar Pictures acquired the rights to make a feature film based on Geronimo Stilton. The film is a co-production between Radar and the Italian company Atlantyca Entertainment, which also produced a TV series based on the character, with Dreamworks Animation veteran David Soren attached to write and direct and Anthony Tringali, Michael Napoliello and Maria Frisk set to produce under Radar Pictures.

TV series

An animated series of the same name debuted in Italy on 15 September 2009. The show ran for 78 episodes across three seasons (26 episodes for each season) with the series finale airing on 28 February 2017.

Theatre
The Kingdom of Fantasy series has been developed into a musical theatre show, which has been performed in Spanish in Barcelona, Spain, in Dutch in Hong Kong and The Netherlands, in Dutch/Flemish in Belgium, and in both English and French in Montreal, Canada.

In 2016, Oregon Children's Theatre produced Geronimo Stilton: Mouse in Space, a world-premiere adaptation of Mouse in Space! by John Maclay, and the first live-action production of Geronimo Stilton media in the United States. The production was performed in Canada in 2018.

Video games
Sony Computer Entertainment partnered with Virtual Toys to develop two video games based on the series for PlayStation Portable. The first, Geronimo Stilton in the Kingdom of Fantasy, was released in Europe on 3 November 2011. The follow-up, Geronimo Stilton: Return to the Kingdom of Fantasy, was released in the continent on 31 October 2012. In North America, both titles were released exclusively on the PlayStation Store on 16 July 2013.

References

External links

 
 Geronimo Stilton graphic novels from Papercutz at Graphite Comics

Anthropomorphic mice and rats
Italian children's literature
Series of children's books
Children's books adapted into television shows
Books about mice and rats
Stilton, Geronimo
Scholastic franchises
Book series introduced in 2000